Astrotech or astrotechnology or variation, may refer to:

Companies
 Astrotech Corporation (formerly SpaceHab), a space technology incubator and space services firm, a partner of NASA
 Astrotech Group, a Chinese aerospace company
 Astro-Technology SOHLA, a Japanese public-private partnership consortium of Osaka Prefecture

Technology
 The technology of astronomy
 Space technology of aerospace
 alien technology from unidentified flying objects

See also
 Technology (disambiguation)
 Tech (disambiguation)
 Astro (disambiguation)